is an original Japanese anime television series produced by animation studio Gathering. It aired from July 4, 2016, to September 26, 2016. The series follows a white cat who lives inside a banana. It was streamed outside of Japan by Crunchyroll.  A second season aired from October 1, 2019, to December 24, 2019.

Plot 
Discovering a new species of tiny cats living inside of bananas, the anime revolves around their lives. Bananya's lifelong dream is to bathe in chocolate with all of his banana cat friends. Until then, they are trying to live their lives as best as they can in a normal household.

Characters

Narrator

Production
Production of a Bananya television anime was originally announced by stationery company Q-Lia, creator of Shizuku-chan, with a crowdfunding campaign to aid production of the series. Bananya began airing from July 4, 2016, and ended on September 26, 2016. Kyō Yatate directed the series at studio Gathering with production cooperation by TMS Entertainment. Each episode is three minutes, and the ending theme is "Lucky Holiday", performed by AXELL featuring Yūki Kaji.

Outside of Asia, Crunchyroll licensed the first series internationally, with home video distribution handled by Discotek Media in North America, who also produced an English dub for the series. The series is available on Kabillion. Medialink licensed the series in South and Southeast Asia.

On August 7, 2019, the official website revealed that a second anime series titled  was in production, and aired from October 1, 2019, to December 24, 2019. Outside of Asia, Crunchyroll licensed the second anime series for distribution internationally with home video distribution handled by Discotek Media in North America, who also produced an English dub for the series. In South and Southeast Asia, Medialink also licensed the second series.

Episode list

Bananya

Bananya and the Curious Bunch

Notes

References

External links
  
 Bananya Character Official Website
 

2016 anime television series debuts
2019 anime television series debuts
Animated television series about cats
Bananas in popular culture
Comedy anime and manga
Crunchyroll anime
Discotek Media
Gathering
Japanese children's animated comedy television series
TMS Entertainment
Anime with original screenplays
Medialink